Turricula gemmulaeformis is a species of sea snail, a marine gastropod mollusk in the family Clavatulidae.

Description
The length of the shell attains 10 mm, its diameter 3.25 mm.

Distribution
This marine species occurs off Sumatra.

References

 Thiele, Wissenschaft Ergebn. Deutsche Tiefsee-Exped. vol. 17, Castr. 2, p. 3.36, pi. 24, fig. 20.

External links
 Indo-Pacific Mollusca; Academy of Natural Sciences of Philadelphia. Delaware Museum of Natural History v. 2 no. 9–10 (1968–1969)

gemmulaeformis
Gastropods described in 1925